The following is a list of all reported tropical cyclones within the Australian region between 90°E and 160°E in the 1960s. During the decade, tropical cyclones were named by the New Caledonia Meteorological Service, while the Australian Bureau of Meteorology started to name them during the 1963–64 season.

Systems

1960–61 
July 15–21, 1960 – A tropical cyclone existed over the Indian Ocean.
November 29–30, 1960 – A tropical cyclone existed over the Indian Ocean.
December 15–24, 1960 – A tropical cyclone existed over the Arafura Sea and moved towards north-western Australia.
December 29, 1960 – January 3, 1961 – A tropical cyclone existed over the Indian Ocean.
January 2–6, 1961 – A tropical cyclone existed over the Coral Sea and impacted the Cape York Peninsular.
January 7–14, 1961 – Tropical Cyclone Barberine.
January 8–11, 1961 – A tropical cyclone existed near the Cocos Islands.
January 15–27, 1961 – A tropical cyclone existed over the Arafura Sea and moved towards north-western Australia.
January 26 – February 4, 1961 – A tropical cyclone existed over the Coral Sea.
February 3–11, 1961 – Tropical Cyclone Catherine.
February 8–13, 1961 – A tropical cyclone existed over the Timor Sea and moved towards north-western Australia.
February 12–17, 1961 – A tropical cyclone existed near the Cocos Islands.
February 20 – March 3, 1961 – A tropical cyclone existed over the Timor Sea and moved towards the Indian Ocean.
February 20 – March 3, 1961 – A tropical cyclone existed over the Arafura Sea and moved towards north-western Australia.
February 21 – March 2, 1961 – A tropical cyclone existed near Christmas Island and the Cocos Islands.
March 2–8, 1961 – A tropical cyclone moved across the Gulf of Carpentria and the Cape York Peninsular, before impacting the Solomon Islands.
March 15–21, 1961 - Tropical Cyclone Isis.

1961–62 
November 29 – December 8, 1961 – A tropical cyclone existed over the Solomon Sea and moved towards New Caledonia.
December 22–25, 1961 – A tropical cyclone existed over the Coral Sea near Queensland, Australia.
January 7–14, 1962 – A tropical cyclone impacted Western Australia and made landfall on the Kimberley.
January 20–31, 1962 – A tropical cyclone existed off the coast of Northwestern Australia.
January 27 – February 12, 1962 – A tropical cyclone existed in the Timor Sea and made landfall on the Kimberley before moving out into the Indian Ocean.
February 9–22, 1962 – A tropical cyclone existed over the Kimberley, before moving out into the Indian Ocean.
February 16–19, 1962 – A tropical cyclone existed over the Gulf of Carpentaria.
March 2–6, 1962 – A tropical cyclone existed near the Cocos Islands.

1962–63 
October 6–16, 1962 – A tropical cyclone existed over the Indian Ocean and went on to impact Madagascar.
December 16–29, 1962 – A tropical cyclone existed over the Indian Ocean.
December 24–27, 1962 – A tropical cyclone existed over the Coral Sea to the east of Willis Island.
December 31, 1962 – January 1, 1963 – A tropical cyclone impacted Double Island Point in Queensland.
January 1–11, 1963 – A tropical cyclone existed over the Indian Ocean.
January 1, 1963 – Tropical Cyclone Annie.
January 7–15, 1963 – A tropical cyclone existed in the Timor Sea and moved towards north-western Australia.
January 9–17, 1963 – A tropical cyclone existed over the Indian Ocean and went on to impact Madagascar.
January 13–14, 1963 – A tropical cyclone existed over the Coral Sea.
January 19–30, 1963 – A tropical cyclone existed in the Timor Sea and moved towards north-western Australia.
January 20–23, 1963 – A tropical cyclone existed over the Coral Sea.
January 21–24, 1963 – A tropical cyclone existed over the Indian Ocean.
January 25–27, 1963 – A tropical cyclone existed over the Coral Sea.
January 29 – February 4, 1963 – A tropical cyclone existed over the Indian Ocean.
January 29 – February 2, 1963 – A tropical cyclone existed over the Coral Sea.
February 3–10, 1963 – A tropical cyclone made landfall on Western Australia.
February 3–8, 1963 – A tropical cyclone moved from Willis Island towards New Zealand.
February 12–17, 1963 – A tropical cyclone existed over the Kimberley.
February 16–19, 1963 – A tropical cyclone existed in the Timor Sea.
February 15–20, 1963 – A tropical cyclone existed over the Coral Sea and moved towards New Zealand.
March 1–8, 1963 – A tropical cyclone existed over the Coral Sea and impacted Vanuatu and New Caledonia.
March 14–16, 1963 – A tropical cyclone impacted Southern Queensland.
March 22–25, 1963 – A tropical cyclone impacted Townsville.
March 25–26, 1963 – A tropical cyclone impacted the Gulf of Carpentaria.
March 26–30, 1963 – A tropical cyclone moved from the Gulf of Carpentaria into central Queensland.
March 30 – April 6, 1963 – A tropical cyclone moved from Queensland to the Kermaderic Islands.
April 10–14, 1963 – A tropical cyclone existed over the Arnhem Land.
April 10–14, 1963 – A tropical cyclone existed over the Arnhem Land.
April 20–26, 1963 – A tropical cyclone existed over the Coral Sea, to the southeast of New Guinea.
May 2–9, 1963 – A tropical cyclone existed over the Coral Sea and impacted Southern Queensland.
May 6–8, 1963 – A tropical cyclone impacted Queensland and New South Wales.
May 7–8, 1963 – A tropical cyclone impacted Queensland.
May 8–14, 1963 – A tropical cyclone existed over the Coral Sea.
May 10–12, 1963 – A tropical cyclone existed over the Coral Sea and impacted New Caledonia.
June 22–25, 1963 – A tropical cyclone existed over the Coral Sea and impacted New Caledonia.
June 23 – July 4, 1963 – A tropical cyclone impacted Queensland and New South Wales.
June 25–29, 1963 – A tropical cyclone impacted Queensland and New South Wales.

1963–64 
December 15–23, 1963 – A tropical cyclone impacted the Solomon Islands.
January 4 –11, 1964 – Severe Tropical Cyclone Bessie.
January 11, 1964 – Tropical Cyclone Audrey.
January 28 – February 9, 1964 – Tropical Cyclone Dora.
January 27 – February 2, 1964 – Tropical Cyclone Bertha.
February 2–9, 1964 – Tropical Cyclone Dolly.
March 6–10, 1964 – Tropical Cyclone Carmen.
March 24 – April 2, 1964 – Tropical Cyclone Katie.
April 15–16, 1964 – Tropical Cyclone Gertie.

1964–65 
December 5–6, 1964 – Tropical Cyclone Flora.
January 14, 1965 – A tropical cyclone made landfall to the south of Thursday Island.
January 28–29, 1965 – Tropical Cyclone Judy.
February 22 – March 1, 1965 – Tropical Cyclone Marie.
February 25 – March 7, 1965 – Tropical Cyclone Gay-Olive.
March 7–12, 1965 – Tropical Cyclone Joan.
March 15–18, 1965 – Tropical Cyclone Cynthia.
March 24-April 4, 1965 – Tropical Cyclone Ruth.

1965–66 
December 25 – January 2, 1965 – Tropical Cyclone Amanda.
January 16–19, 1966 – Tropical Cyclone Joy.
February 10–13, 1966 – Tropical Cyclone Betty.
February 23 – March 2, 1966 – Tropical Cyclone Connie.
Dolly
April 2, 1966 – Tropical Cyclone Shirley.

1966–67 
November 13–16, 1966 – Tropical Cyclone Angela.
November 22–30, 1966 – Tropical Cyclone Beryl.
December 2–5, 1967 – A tropical cyclone existed near the Santa Cruz Islands.
Clara
Delilah
Edith
January 28–30, 1967 – Tropical Cyclone Dinah.
February 18–22, 1967 – Tropical Cyclone Barbara.
March 18, 1967 – Tropical Cyclone Elaine.
March 16–19, 1967 – Tropical Cyclone Glenda.

1967–68 
November 10–16, 1967 – Tropical Cyclone Annie.
December 6–10, 1967 – A tropical cyclone existed off the east coast of Australia.
December 9–12, 1967 – A tropical low existed off the east coast of Australia.
December 29, 1967 – January 9, 1968 - Tropical Cyclone Elspeth.
December 30, 1967 – January 5, 1968 – Tropical Cyclone Amy existed over the central Indian Ocean.
January 11–17, 1968 – Tropical Cyclone Betsy.
January 14–24, 1968 – Tropical Cyclone Brenda.
January 19–20, 1968 – Tropical Cyclone Bertha.
January 19–24, 1968 – Tropical Cyclone Doreen.
January 27–30, 1968 – A possible tropical storm existed over the Coral Sea near Vanuatu.
January 28, 1968 – Tropical Cyclone Dixie.
February 2–5, 1968 – A tropical low existed in the Gulf of Carpentaria.
February 5–7, 1968 – Tropical Cyclone Ella.
February 12–16, 1968 – A tropical low existed in the Gulf of Carpentaria.
February 13–20, 1968 – Tropical Cyclone Gina-Janine.
February 20–27, 1968 – Tropical Cyclone Bonnie.
February 25–28, 1968 – A tropical low existed off the east coast of Australia.
March 1–7, 1968 – Tropical Cyclone Florence.
April 5–9, 1968 – Tropical Cyclone Giselle.

1968–69 
1968–69 Australian region cyclone season
November 23–29, 1968 – Tropical Cyclone Adele.
December 11–15, 1968 – Tropical Cyclone Becky.
December 16–23, 1968 – Tropical Cyclone Amber.
December 19–25, 1968 – Tropical Cyclone Beatie.
December 27–30, 1968 – Tropical Cyclone Bettina.
December 27–30, 1968 – Tropical Cyclone Cheri.
January 24–27, 1969 – Tropical Cyclone Bridget.
January 28 – February 5, 1969 – Tropical Cyclone Colleen.
February 4–15, 1969 – Tropical Cyclone Enid-Fanny.
February 15–20, 1969 – Tropical Cyclone Gladys.
February 21–24, 1969 – Tropical Cyclone Irene.
February 26 – March 2, 1969 – A possible tropical storm existed near the Solomon Islands.
March 1–5, 1969 – Tropical Cyclone Audrey.
April 1969 – Two tropical cyclones existed of the coast of Western Australia.
March 29 – April 7, 1969 – Tropical Cyclone Leonie.
April 25 – May 4, 1969 – Tropical Cyclone Esther.

1969–70 
1969–70 Australian region cyclone season
November 8–9, 1969 – Tropical Cyclone Blossom.
January 3–9, 1970 – Tropical Cyclone Diane-Françoise.
January 3–19, 1970 – Severe Tropical Cyclone Ada.
January 27 – February 6, 1970 – Tropical Cyclone Glynis.
February 1–15, 1970 – Tropical Cyclone Harriet-Iseult.
February 9–17 – Tropical Cyclone Ingrid.
February 9–27 – Tropical Cyclone Judy.
February 10–19 – Tropical Cyclone Dawn.
February 10–12, 1970 – Tropical Cyclone Florence.
March 11–21, 1970 – Tropical Cyclone Cindy.
March 19 – March 25, 1970 – Tropical Cyclone Kathy-Michelle.
April 14–19, 1970 – Tropical Cyclone Isa.
May 4–9, 1970 – Tropical Cyclone Lulu.

See also 
Australian region tropical cyclone
Atlantic hurricane seasons: 1960, 1961, 1962, 1963, 1964, 1965, 1966, 1967, 1968, 1969
Eastern Pacific hurricane seasons: 1960, 1961, 1962, 1963, 1964, 1965, 1966, 1967, 1968, 1969
Western Pacific typhoon seasons: 1960, 1961, 1962, 1963, 1964, 1965, 1966, 1967, 1968, 1969
North Indian Ocean cyclone seasons: 1960, 1961, 1962, 1963, 1964, 1965, 1966, 1967, 1968, 1969

References

External links 

Australian region cyclone seasons
 disasters in Oceania